Yunita Rachman or better known as Yura Yunita (born in Bandung, West Java, Indonesia on June 9, 1991) is an Indonesian singer and songwriter of Sundanese descent.

Having succeeded with the hit "Cinta Dan Rahasia", she then released a third single entitled "Berawal Dari Tatap", which was released in conjunction with her music video, www.youtube.com/yurayunita. The single release, "Berawal Dari Tatap", was on top charts in major cities in Indonesia. This song was written by her.

In the beginning of 2015, she became a line-up artist at the 2015 Jakarta International Java Jazz Festival. In 2015, she also got three nominations in the 2015 Indonesia Choice Awards for category "Female Singer of the Year", "Breakthrough Artist of the Year", and "Song of the Year" (for the song "Cinta Dan Rahasia").

On 21 September 2018, Yura released her second album, Merakit. Six days later, she won her third Anugerah Musik Indonesia (AMI) Award for the Best Pop Female Solo Artist category, with the single Harus Bahagia.

Yura obtained her Bachelor's degree from Faculty of Communication, Padjadjaran University.

Discography

Studio album
Yura (2014)
Merakit (2018)

Singles

As lead artist

As a featured artist

Videography

Music videos

Awards and nominations

References

External links
 Official site
 Yura on SoundCloud
 Yura on Instagram

1991 births
Living people
Sundanese people
English-language singers from Indonesia
21st-century Indonesian women singers
Indonesian jazz singers
Indonesian pop singers
Indonesian soul singers